Atka may refer to:
Atka, Alaska, a city in the United States, on Atka Island
Atka Airport, a public airport in Alaska, United States
Atka, Russia, an urban-type settlement in Magadan Oblast, Russia
Atka Iceport, an iceport in West Antarctica
Atka Island, in the Andreanof Islands
Mount Atka (AKA Korovin Volcano), the highest point of Atka Island
USCGC Southwind (WAGB-280) (USS Atka (AGB-3)), a United States Coast Guard ice breaker